Quercus bambusifolia is a species of flowering plant in the family Fagaceae, native to southeast China, Hainan and Vietnam. It was first described by Henry Fletcher Hance in 1857. It is placed in subgenus Cerris, section Cyclobalanopsis.

References

bambusifolia
Flora of Southeast China
Flora of Hainan
Flora of Vietnam
Plants described in 1857